2007 was designated as the International Heliophysical Year and the International Polar Year.

Events

January
 January 1 
Bulgaria and Romania join the European Union, while Slovenia joins the Eurozone.
 Adam Air Flight 574, en route to Manado, Indonesia, from Surabaya, Indonesia, crashes into the Makassar Strait; killing all 102 on board.
 January 8 – Russian oil supplies to Poland, Germany, and Ukraine are cut as the Russia–Belarus energy dispute escalates; they are restored three days later.
 January 9 – Apple CEO Steve Jobs introduces the original iPhone at a Macworld keynote in San Francisco, beginning a new era of smartphones with this invention.
 January 31 - Boston faces a hoax bomb scare, as a result of LED placards of Ignignokt and Err from Aqua Teen Hunger Force being mistaken as an improvised explosive device

February
February 2 – The IPCC publishes its fourth assessment report, having concluded that global climate change is "very likely" to have a predominantly human cause.
 February 3 – A truck bomb explodes in Baghdad, Iraq, killing at least 135 people and injures 339 others.
 February 13 – North Korea agrees to shut down its nuclear facilities in Yongbyon by April 14 as a first step towards complete denuclearization, receiving in return energy aid equivalent to 50,000 tons of heavy fuel oil.
 February 19 – Microblogging social network Tumblr is launched to the public.
 February 26 – The International Court of Justice finds Serbia guilty of failing to prevent genocide in the Srebrenica massacre, but clears it of direct responsibility and complicity in the case.

March
 March 1 – The fourth International Polar Year, a $1.73 billion research program to study both the North Pole and South Pole, is launched in Paris.
 March 3 – A total lunar eclipse occurs and is visible in the Americas, Europe, Africa and Asia. It is the 52nd lunar eclipse of Lunar Saros series 123 occurring at the moon's descending node. The moon is just 3.2 days before apogee, making it fairly small.
 March 11 – According to an accusation by Georgia, three Russian helicopters fire on the Georgian-controlled Kodori Gorge in a break-away autonomous republic of Abkhazia in north-western Georgia.
 March 13 – April 28 – The 2007 Cricket World Cup is held in the West Indies and is won by Australia.
 March 19 – The first solar eclipse of the year 2007 is a partial solar eclipse occurring just 0.7 days before perigee, making it very large. The Moon covers 87.558% of the Sun. In this partial solar eclipse, the best visibility occurs at 61º02'55" N, 55º28'04" E. It is the 20th solar eclipse of Solar Saros series 149, at ascending node. The Sun is its zenith just 83 km south of the Equator, so the Northern Hemisphere was in winter and the Southern Hemisphere was in summer on March 19, 2007.
 March 23 – Naval forces of Islamic Revolutionary Guard Corps arrest Royal Navy personnel in disputed Iran-Iraq waters; they were released on April 4.
 March 25 – A 6.7 magnitude earthquake kills at least one in western Japan.
 March 27 – Latvian Prime Minister Aigars Kalvītis and Russian Prime Minister Mikhail Fradkov sign a border treaty between Latvia and Russia, officially demarcating the border between the two.

April
 April 16 – Virginia tech massacre: 23 year-old Seung-Hui Cho fatally shot 32 people and injured 17 others. He used two semi-automatic pistols to kill them and killed himself as police arrived on the scene.
 April 18 – 18 April 2007 Baghdad bombings: A series of attacks take place across Baghdad, Iraq, killing nearly 200 people.
 April 24 – Gliese 581c, a potentially Earth-like extrasolar planet habitable for life, is discovered in the constellation Libra.
 April 26–27 – "Bronze Night": Ethnic Russian riot in Tallinn and other cities in Estonia against the moving of the Bronze Soldier of Tallinn, a Soviet World War II memorial statue. 2007 cyberattacks on Estonia begin.

May
 May 5 – Kenya Airways Flight 507, on a scheduled passenger flight from Doula, Cameroon, to Nairobi, Kenya, crashes after takeoff, killing all 114 crew and passengers on board.
 May 10 – As a result of factors including the Blair-Brown pact and falling approval ratings as a result of the Iraq War, British Prime Minister Tony Blair announces his intention to resign as Leader of the Labour Party and Prime Minister, triggering the 2007 Labour Party leadership election, in which Chancellor Gordon Brown ran unopposed. Brown would officially replace Blair as Prime Minister on 27 June.
 May 10–12 – The Eurovision Song Contest 2007 takes place in Helsinki, Finland, and is won by Serbian entrant Marija Šerifović with the song "Molitva".
 May 17 – The Russian Orthodox Church Abroad and the Moscow Patriarchate re-unite after 80 years of schism.
 May 20 – Sheikh Mohammed bin Rashid Al Maktoum of Dubai makes the largest single charitable donation in modern history, committing €7.41 billion to an educational foundation in the Middle East.

June
 June 5 – NASA's MESSENGER spacecraft makes its second fly-by of Venus en route to Mercury.
 June 15 – Bob Barker hosts his final episode of The Price Is Right after over 44 years of hosting.
 June 27 – Gordon Brown succeeds Tony Blair and becomes Prime Minister of the United Kingdom after a Leadership Election
 June 28 – 2007 European heat wave: in the aftermath of Greece's worst heat wave in a century, at least 11 people are reported dead from heatstroke, approximately 200 wildfires break out nationwide, and the country's electricity grid nearly collapses due to record breaking demand.
 June 29 – The iPhone, the first modern smartphone, is released in the United States.  It was later released in the United Kingdom, France, Germany, the Republic of Ireland and Austria in November 2007.

July
 July 4 – The International Olympic Committee awards Sochi the right to host the 2014 Winter Olympics.
 July 7 – Live Earth Concerts are held in nine major cities around the world to raise environmental awareness.
 July 17 – TAM Airlines Flight 3054 an Airbus A320-233 overruns the runway of São Paulo–Congonhas Airport runway 35L flies over Avenida Washington Luís and crashes into TAM Express building and a shell filling station adjacent to the TAM Express building. All 187 passengers and crew are killed instantly. 12 people inside the TAM Express and the Shell filling station are also killed.
 July 24 – Five Bulgarian nurses are released from Libyan prison after eight and a half years spent behind bars in Benghazi and Tripoli, marking the end of the so-called "HIV trial in Libya".
 July 31 – Operation Banner comes to an end, thus ending the longest continuous deployment in British military history.

August
 August 4 – The Phoenix spacecraft is launched toward Mars to study its north pole.
 August 9 – The French global bank BNP Paribas in the United Kingdom blocks withdrawals from three hedge funds heavily committed in sub-prime mortgages, signaling the financial crisis of 2007–2008.
 August 14 – Multiple suicide bombings kill 572 people in Qahtaniya, northern Iraq.
 August 15 – An 8.0 earthquake strikes Peru, killing at least 519 people, injuring more than 1,300, and causing tsunami warnings in the Pacific Ocean.

September
 September 6 – Israeli Air Force airplanes attack a suspected nuclear reactor in Syria in an airstrike.
 September 13 – The United Nations General Assembly adopts the Declaration on the Rights of Indigenous Peoples.
 September 14 – The SELENE spacecraft launches, with its objective being to study the Moon.
 September 20 – The Universal Forum of Cultures opens in Monterrey, Mexico.
 September 25 – Mount Ruapehu in Tongariro National Park in New Zealand, erupts.

October
October 22 – Montenegro adopts a new constitution, which among other things changes the country's official name from "Republic of Montenegro" to "Montenegro".
October 28 – Cristina Fernández de Kirchner becomes the first directly elected female President of Argentina.
Sports TV Uganda Limited is incorporated in Uganda.

November
 November 7 – Whistleblower website WikiLeaks leaks the standard US army protocol at Guantanamo Bay.
 November 16 – Up to 15,000 people are believed to have been killed after Cyclone Sidr hits Bangladesh.
 November 24 – 2007 Australian federal election: The Labor Party led by Kevin Rudd defeats the Liberal/National Coalition Government led by Prime Minister John Howard. Rudd would be sworn in on December 3.

December
 December 13 – The Treaty of Lisbon is signed by members states of European Union.
 December 20 – The Pablo Picasso painting Portrait of Suzanne Bloch, together with Candido Portinari's O Lavrador de Café, is stolen from the São Paulo Museum of Art.
 December 21 – The Czech Republic, Estonia, Hungary, Latvia, Lithuania, Malta, Poland, Slovakia, and Slovenia join the Schengen border-free zone.
 December 27
 Former Pakistani prime minister Benazir Bhutto is assassinated, along with 20 other people, at an election rally in Rawalpindi.
 Riots erupt in Mombasa, Kenya, after Mwai Kibaki is declared the winner of the general election, triggering a political, economic, and humanitarian crisis that killed over 1,000 people.

Unknown date
 Mauritania is the last country to criminalise slavery (officially "abolished" in 1981), making the practice illegal everywhere in the world.

Births and Deaths

Nobel Prizes

 Chemistry – Gerhard Ertl
 Economics – Leonid Hurwicz, Eric Maskin, and Roger Myerson
 Literature – Doris Lessing
 Peace – Albert Gore Jr, and the United Nations Intergovernmental Panel on Climate Change
 Physics – Albert Fert, Peter Grünberg
 Physiology or Medicine – Mario Capecchi, Oliver Smithies, and Sir Martin Evans

New English words and terms

additive manufacturing
colony collapse disorder
hashtag
listicle
netbook
sharing economy
tweep

References

External links
 2007 Calendar at Internet Accuracy Project.